Alaska: Spirit of the Wild is a documentary film featuring the landscape and wildlife of Alaska. It is directed by George Casey, narrated by Charlton Heston and was distributed to IMAX theaters in 1997.

Alaskan wildlife featured in the film include moose, bears, seals, wolves, caribou, and whales, while narrator Heston provides background information. Aerial and underwater photography are utilized throughout the production. Casey had previously created the documentary, Africa: The Serengeti, also for IMAX.

The film has been well-received by critics and was nominated for the Academy Award for Best Documentary Short Subject in 1998.

References

External links
 

1990s short documentary films
1997 films
1990s English-language films
American short documentary films
IMAX short films
Natural history of Alaska
Documentary films about nature
Films shot in Alaska
IMAX documentary films
Films set in Alaska
Inuktitut-language films
Documentary films about Alaska
1990s American films